A by-election was held in the Nanumea constituency in Tuvalu on 19 September 2014. It followed the resignation of the incumbent, Willy Telavi, in August.

Context
Willy Telavi had been Prime Minister of Tuvalu until August 2013, when he had been ousted in a parliamentary vote of no confidence, having lost his majority. He was absent for much of the parliamentary year that followed, tending to his sick wife in Hawaii, and reportedly resigned because of the need to remain at his wife's side.

Nanumea is a two-seat constituency. The other seat, held by Finance Minister Maatia Toafa, is not affected by the by-election. Telavi sat on the Opposition benches, and prior to the by-election Prime Minister Enele Sopoaga's government had a two-thirds majority in Parliament. The outcome of the by-election therefore did not affect the government's majority.

Result
Satini Tulaga Manuella was the successful candidate. The former USP Senior Accountant and president of the Tuvalu National Private Sector Organization (TNPSO) supports the government of Enele Sopoaga. There were only two candidates, and the results were as follows:

2010 election
In the 2010 general election, the results had been as follows.

References

2014 elections in Oceania
2014 in Tuvalu
By-elections to the Parliament of Tuvalu
Non-partisan elections